Michael Najjar (born in 1966 in Landau) is a German artist, adventurer and Future Astronaut. He lives and works in Berlin. In his artwork he takes a complex critical look at the technological forces shaping and drastically transforming the early 21st century.

Life and education 
Najjar attended the bildo Academy of Arts in Berlin from 1988 – 1993. During this time he immersed himself in the visionary theories of media philosophers such as Vilém Flusser, Paul Virilio and Jean Baudrillard, which have markedly influenced his later work. 
In 1993 he completed his studies with a diploma in media art with a focus on photography. The marked global outlook shown in his art is colored by his life and work in Brazil, Cuba, Spain, England, Japan and the United States. Michael Najjar was a Hasselblad Ambassador from 2012 – 2017. Since 2020 he is a board member of the Karman Project, a non profit organisation, based in Berlin. He is also one of Virgin Galactic´s Pioneer Astronauts and will soon be flying into space on board the privately owned SpaceShipTwo.

Work (selection) 
Michael Najjar is one of the most important international photo artists of his generation. In his works he deals in a complex and critical way with the technological developments that are defining and drastically changing the early 21st century. Najjar’s photographic and video works exemplify and draw on his interdisciplinary understanding of art. In his artistic practice he fuses art, science, and technology into visions of future social structures emerging under the impact of cutting-edge technologies. 

Najjar’s work is grouped in thematic series. The variety of themes covered ranges from transformation of global megacities through compaction of information networks (“netropolis” 2003-2006 / 2016 ongoing), depictions of the human body transformed by biogenetic intervention (“bionic angel” 2006-2008) and virtualization of financial markets with smart algorithms (“high altitude” 2008-2010) to the future of the human species through space exploration (“outer space” since 2011). Since 2021 Michael Najjar works on a new series entitled „cool earth“ which explores the future of our planet in times of climate change and focusses on the topic of the Anthropocene, climate engineering and the relationship between humans and nature.

netropolis 
Michael Najjar's work series "netropolis" (2003–2006) is an exploration of the way global cities will develop in the future. Najjar traveled around the globe and climbed – often evading the security guards - the highest towers of twelve megacities. His panoramic view transforms the reality of urban spatial structure into the landscape. The digital fusion of panoramic views taken from different angles transforms the landscape into a woven fabric of relationships. The work shows the endless ocean of information, an all-pervasive network. Compression of space and time evoking intense and constantly growing global interconnectivity.

high altitude 
For “high altitude“ (2008–2010) Michael Najjar climbed Mount Aconcagua whose 6,962 meters (22,841 feet) make it the highest mountain on the planet outside of Asia. In the Andes Najjar photographed mountain ridges whose petrified zigzag curves served him as a representation of the monumentality of financial markets. He patterned the shots he took on the expedition rigorously on the fluctuations of international stock exchange indices. What he shows are the ups and downs of the markets, and how market reality and simulation are so intertwined as to be almost indistinguishable. What we see are the movements of the tectonic plates of the global economy over the past twenty to thirty years in whose course new peaks are thrown up and earthquakes and erosion are inevitable. Najjar shows the sublime in an age when information technology has become all-powerful.

outer space 
Michael Najjar's "outer space" work series deals with the latest developments in space exploration and the way they will shape our future life on Earth, in Earth's near orbit and on other planets.
The cultural dimension represented by emergent cutting-edge space technologies is very much at the center of Najjars's work – in terms of the deeper knowledge these new technologies will impart about the universe, their impact on space travel, and the way they will influence and shape our lives and work on Earth. This ongoing series started in 2011 with the final launch of the American Space Shuttle Atlantis and currently comprises 24 photographic artworks and 4 video works. The artist has traveled to the world's most important spaceports like the Kennedy Space Center, Baikonour Cosmodrome in Kazakhstan and the Guiana Space Centre near Kourou in French Guiana. He has met with numerous scientists, engineers and astronauts, and visited space laboratories around the globe constructing new spacecraft, satellites and telescopes. He traveled to the Atacama Desert in Chile to photograph the world's most powerful telescopes located at sites across high altitude plateaus in the Andes. His collaboration with leading scientists and space agencies has given him privileged access to locations that are usually unknown to and unseen by the public. The present series blends documentary and fictive scenarios to create visionary enactments of current and future space exploration.

One essential hallmark of Najjar's work is the way it is deeply informed by an experiential hands-on approach. The intimate experience of “living through” situations which provide the leitmotifs of his art is vital to the artist. This performative aspect has also become a fundamental part of Najjar's work process and will culminate in the artist's own flight into space. As one of the pioneer astronauts of Virgin Galactic Virgin Galactic, Michael Najjar will be embarking on SpaceShipTwo on one of its future spaceflights where he will be the first artist to travel in space.

To prepare for this flight Najjar is conducting an intensive and ongoing astronaut training program at Star City (GCTC), Russia, the German Space Center (DLR - Deutsches Zentrum für Luft- und Raumfahrt) in Cologne and the National AeroSpace Training And Research Center (NASTAR) in the USA. Defying physical limits, the artist puts his body through a grueling series of training sessions including a stratospheric flight in a MiG-29 jet fighter, zero gravity flights, centrifugal spins, underwater space-walk training in a heavy astronaut suit, and a HALO Jump from an altitude of 10,000m: situations of extremities which he captures on camera to investigate his own physical and mental responses and exemplify them in his works.

Najjar's outer space - series also includes an assembly of contemporary visions of future life and work in space. Inherent in the actual artworks, these visions are commissioned by the artist and articulated in a series of "vision statements" written by leading figures in space exploration, science, architecture and philosophy including Buzz Aldrin, Richard Branson, Tim Smit, Michael Lopez-Alegria, Anousheh Ansari, Norman Foster, and Stephen Hawking.

Works from the “outer space” series have been exhibited internationally in numerous galleries and museums.
In 2014 and 2021, DISTANZ Verlag, Berlin, published two comprehensive books on the series.

cool earth 
Michael Najjar‘s latest work series “cool earth” (2021 ongoing) deals with our planetary future in times of climate change. It addresses the far-reaching ecological, economic and cultural impact of human-induced climate change which is leading to a redefinition of the relationship between humans and nature. The crisis in the human-nature relationship is existential and influences all areas of human life on our planet. The greatest danger to life on Earth is posed by overheating. The rise in the Earth’s temperature to over 2 C will activate various tipping points in the Earth system, changing a previously stable system into a chaotic one and endangering our civilizational existence. To counteract the advancing climate emergency and the existential threat to our planetary ecosystem, researchers and scientists are increasingly discussing the possibility of large-scale technological intervention in the Earth’s natural systems or climate engineering. The term refers to targeted technological interventions in the Earth’s geochemical and biochemical cycles, in the oceans, in the soil, and in the atmosphere. The work series “cool earth” spans the arc from a looming dystopian future – which has already arrived in the present – to a technology-based post-fossil world that requires a redefinition of the human-nature relationship. The artworks of the “cool earth” series combine science and fiction; they imagine the transition to a world without fossil energy and open up a mental field of possibilities for the viewer of how we could shape a liveable, post-destructive world.

Projects Studio Michael Najjar 
In October 2015 Studio Michael Najjar unveiled the world's first futuristic “Space Suite“ at the Kameha Grand Zurich, Switzerland. In 2016 the "Space Suite" by Studio Michael Najjar was finalist for the European Hotel Design Award for the best new Hotel Suite in Europe.

In cooperation with the Michael Stich Foundation, Michael Najjar designed an entire floor for the UKE - Clinic for Pediatric Medicine in Hamburg. The creative concept is based on his "outer space" series.

Selected exhibitions 

Since he first began work in the mid-nineties, his art has been shown in numerous international gallery and museum exhibitions as well as at biennials. In 2004, Harald Szeemann showed his work in "The Beauty of Failure / The Failure of Beauty" at the Joan Miró Foundation in Barcelona. In 2006, he was invited to the 10th Venice Architecture Biennale and also exhibited at the 9th Havana Bienniale in the same year. In 2008, the GEM Museum of Contemporary Art in The Hague staged the first comprehensive overview of his work so far. In 2011, he took part in the ground-breaking exhibition "Atlas - How to carry the world on one's back", which was shown at the Museo Reina Sofía in Madrid, the ZKM Center for Art and Media in Karlsruhe and the Hamburg Deichtorhallen/Phönixhallen. In 2015, his series "outer space" was shown by Peter Weibel in the revolutionary exhibition "Exo-Evolution" at the ZKM Karlsruhe. In 2017, he was invited by Yuko Hasegawa to participate in the 7th International Moscow Biennale.

Furthermore, Najjar has exhibited in the following national and international museums, institutions and galleries: Akademie der Künste, Berlin; Alfred Ehrhardt Foundation, Berlin; Museum Ludwig, Cologne; Kunsthalle Hamburg / Galerie der Gegenwart, Hamburg; Deichtorhallen, Hamburg; Marta Museum, Herford; Edith Russ Haus für Medienkunst, Oldenburg; Kunstmuseum Wolfsburg; Saatchi Gallery, London; Science Museum, London; Museum of Contemporary Art, Birmingham; Centre pour l'image contemporaine, Geneva; Centro de Arte Contemporaneo, Málaga; Museo Es Baluard, Palma de Mallorca; Museo DA2 (Domus Artium 2002), Salamanca; Museum of Contemporary Art, Belgrade; Tampere Art Museum, Tampere; New Media Art Institute, Amsterdam; FORMA International Centre for Photography, Milan; Museum of Art, Tucson; Auckland Art Gallery Toi o Tamaki, Auckland; National Gallery of Victoria, Melbourne; National Museum of Science, Taipei; Central Academy of Fine Arts, Beijing; Ullens Center for Contemporary Art, Beijing; ZheJiang Art Museum, Hangzhou; National Museum of Modern and Contemporary Art, Seoul; Art and Science Museum, Singapore.

Works by Michael Najjar form part of museum-, leading corporate- and private collections across the world, including the ZKM Center for Art and Media Karlsruhe; Museum Ludwig, Cologne; Deichtorhallen Hamburg; Gemeente Museum, The Hague; Centro de Arte Contemporáneo de Málaga, Málaga; Museo Es Baluard, Palma de Mallorca; Muzeum Susch, Switzerland; National Air and Space Museum, Smithsonian Institution, Washington D.C.; Centre national de l’audiovisuel (CNA), Luxembourg. His work regularly features a broad array of international publications.

In 2018 and 2019 Michael Najjar was twice nominated for the Prix Pictet. In 2019 he was short listed for the Sony World Award.

Work series 
 cool earth, 2021 - ongoing
 outer space, 2011 - ongoing
 f1, 2011
 high altitude, 2008–2010
 bionic angel, 2006–2008
 netropolis, 2003–2006
 no memory access, 2001–2005
 information and apocalypse, 2003
 end of sex.as we know it., 2002
 schnittbilder, 2001
 nexus project part I, 1999–2000
 Japanese style, 1999–2000
 ¡viva fidel! – journey into absurdity, 1997

Books and catalogues 

Najjar, Michael, Galería Juan Silió (Hg./eds.):
"Michael Najjar - cool earth",
ex. cat. Madrid, Spain 2023

Beitin, Andreas, Klose, Alexander, Steininger, Benjamin (Hg./eds.):
"Oil. Schönheit und Schrecken des Erdölzeitalters",
Verlag der Buchhandlung Walther und Fritz König,
ex. cat. Cologne, Germany 2021

Najjar, Michael (Hg./eds.): 
"outer space – v2",
Distanz Verlag, Berlin, Germany 2021 

Beatrice, Luca (Hg./eds.): 
"FUTURO – Arte e società dagli anni Sessanta a domani, Gallerie d'Italia – Palazzo Leoni Montanari", 
ex.cat. Vincenza, Italy 2020

Vanhanen, Hannu (Hg./eds.): 
"Space Works - Our Relationship With the Cosmos", 
ex.cat.Tampere Art Museum, Tampere, USA, 2020 

Feireiss, Lukas (Hg./ed.):
"Space is ... the Place", 
Leipzig, Germany 2020

Bollmann, Philipp (Hg./ed.): 
"Mit geliehenen Augen", 
Bielefeld, Germany 2020

Innovationsfabrik Wittenstein (Hg./ed.): 
"Beyond the Horizon", 
ex.cat. Innovationsfabrik Wittenstein, Igersheim, Germany 2019

Rau, Bodo (Hg./ed.), 
"Über Grenzen", 
ex.cat. Kunsthof Bahnitz, Bahnitz, Germany 2019

Brenner, Neil (Hg./ed.), 
"New urban Spaces", 
New York, USA, 2019

Ewing, William A. & Roussel, Holly (Hg./eds.), 
"Civilization – The Way We Live Now", 
ex.cat. London, GB, 2018

Bollmann, Philipp (Hg./ed.), 
"Sichtspiele – Filme und Videokunst aus der Sammlung Wemhöner", 
Berlin, Germany, 2018

Feireiss, Lukas (ed.), Najjar Michael (ed.), 
"Planetary Echoes. Exploring the implications of human settlement in space", 
Leipzig, Germany 2017

Najjar, Michael (ed.)
"outer space",
Distanz Verlag, Berlin, Germany 2014

Bollmann, Philipp (ed.):
"In-Sight - Photographs from the Wemhöner Collection", 
Kerber Verlag, Bielefeld, Germany, 2012

Najjar, Michael (ed.):
"high altitude"
Kerber Verlag, Bielefeld, Germany, 2011

Bollmann, Philipp (ed.):
“Focus Asia - Einblicke in die Sammlung Wemhöner”
Kerber Verlag, Bielefeld, Germany, 2011

Kolczynska, Paulina “Identity, or on a variety of perspectives”
in: “Identity - Photographs of the Grazyna Kulczyk Collection” 
ex. cat., Poznan, Poland, 2011

Museum für Kunst und Gewerbe (ed.):
“Portraits in series - a century of photographs”
ex. cat., Kerber Verlag, Bielefeld, Germany, 2011

Rau, Bodo (Ed.):
“Architektur in der Kunst - Architekturen des Augenblicks”
ex. cat., Bahnitz, Germany, 2011

Herschdorfer, Nathalie (ed.):
“High altitude - Photography in the mountains”
ex. cat., 5 continents editions, Milan, Italy, 2011

Melis, Wim (ed.):
“metropolis”
Stichting Aurora Borealis, Photo Festival, 
Groningen, Netherlands, 2011

Klanten, Robert / Ehmann, Sven / Schulze, Floyd (eds.):
“Visual storytelling: inspiring a new visual language”
Die Gestalten Verlag, Berlin, Germany, 2011

Damian, Angela / Azoulay, Elizabeth / Frioux, Dalibor (eds.):
“100.000 years of beauty”
Editions Babylone, Paris, France, 2010

Klanten, Robert / Ehmann, Sven / Bourquin, Nicolas (eds.):
“data flow 2”
Die Gestalten Verlag, Berlin, Germany, 2010

Klanten, Robert / Feireiss, Lukas (eds.):
“Beyond architecture. Imaginative buildings and fictional cities”
Die Gestalten Verlag, Berlin, Germany, 2009

Kerner, Charlotte (ed.):
“next generation” 
Belz & Gelberg, Weinheim, Germany, 2009

Sasse, Julie (ed.):
“Trouble in paradise: examining the discord between nature and society” 
ex. cat., Tucson Museum of Art, Tucson, USA, 2009

Edgar Quadt (ed.):  
“Artinvestor - Wie man erfolgreich in Kunst investiert”
Finanzbuch Verlag, Munich, Germany, 2008

van Sinderen, Wim (ed.):
“Augmented realities - Michael Najjar works 1997-2008”
ex. cat., GEM - The Hague Museum of Photography
Veenman Publishers, Rotterdam, Netherlands, 2008

Miha, Andy (ed.):
“Human futures: art in an age of uncertainty”
Fact & Liverpool University Press, Liverpool, UK, 2008

Bitforms Gallery / Galería Juan Silió / Najjar, Michael (Ed.):
“bionic angel”
Berlin, Germany, 2008

Scarpato, Rosario / Piccioni, Monica (eds.):
“Map games: dynamics of change”
ex. cat., Central Academy of Fine Arts, Beijing, China, 2008

Es Baluard,  Museu d’Art Modern i Contemporani de Palma (ed.):
“en privat1”
ex. cat., Museo Es Baluard, Palma, Spain, 2008

Sacks, Steve (ed.):
“bitforms gallery”
bitforms gallery, New York, USA, 2008

Explorafoto y Fundación Salamanca Ciudad de Cultura (ed.):
“Michael Najjar - information and apocalypse”
ex. cat., DA2, Domus Artium 2002, Salamanca, Spain, 2007

Ewing, William (ed.): 
“Face - the new photographic portrait”
Thames & Hudson, London, UK, 2006

Herrera, Nelson (ed.): 
“9th Havana Biennal 2006”
ex. cat., Centro de Arte Contemporáneo Wifredo Lam 
Havana, Cuba, 2006

Sanz, Antonio (ed.):
“C on cities”
ex. cat., 10. Mostra Internazionale di Architettura La Biennale di Venezia, 
Italy, 2006

Panera, Javier (ed.): 
“Mascaradas politicas”
Explorafoto - Festival Internacional de Fotografía de Castilla y León. 
ex. cat., DA2, Domus Artium 2002, Salamanca, Spain, 2006

Himmelsbach, Sabine (ed.): 
“Sichtbarkeiten”
ex. cat., Edith-Ruß-Site for Media Art, 
Oldenburg, Germany, 2006

Bitforms / Juan Silió / Guy Bärtschi / Najjar, Michael (eds.):
“netropolis”
Berlin, Germany, 2006

Najjar, Michael (ed.):
“japanese style”
ex. cat., Federal Foreign Office, 
Berlin, Germany, 2005

Mellis, Wim (ed.): 
“traces and omens” 
Stichting Aurora Borealis,  Photo Festival, 
Groningen, Netherlands, 2005

Szeemann, Harald (ed.):
“The beauty of failure / the failure of beauty” 
ex. cat., Fundació Joan Miró, Barcelona, Spain, 2004

Kemp, Sandra (ed.): 
“Future face - image, identity, innovation” 
Profile books ldt, 
ex. cat., Science Museum London, London, UK, 2004

bitforms gallery / Najjar, Michael (eds.): 
“netropolis”
Berlin, Germany, 2004

Felix, Zdenek (ed.): 
“A clear vision. Photographische Werke aus der Sammlung F.C. Gundlach” 
Hatje Cantz Verlag, 
ex. cat., International House of Photography 
Deichtorhallen, Hamburg, Germany, 2003

Goethe-Institut New York, Najjar, Michael (eds.): 
“Information and Apocalypse”
ex. cat., Goethe-Institut New York 
Berlin, Germany, 2003

Triennale der Photographie Hamburg (ed.):
“Reality-Check”
ex. cat., 2. Triennale der Photographie,
Hamburg, Germany, 2002

Philipp, Gabriele (ed.):
“Mythos St.Pauli - Photographien 1967-2002” 
ex. cat., Museum für Kunst und Gewerbe, 
Bönnigheim, Germany, 2002

Klanten, Robert / Peyerl, Andreas  (eds.):
“Surreality localizer”
Die Gestalten Verlag, Berlin, Germany, 1997

References

External links 
 https://www.michaelnajjar.com/
 http://www.bankmabsociety.com/
 https://juansilio.com/
 https://www.artitledcontemporary.com/
 https://studiolacitta.it/
 http://www.artnet.de/michael-najjar/

1966 births
Living people
German artists